Thomas Hesketh Douglas Blair Cochrane, 13th Earl of Dundonald (21 February 1886 – 23 May 1958) was an officer in the British Army who served in World War I. He was a representative peer for Scotland and chairman of the Anglo-Chilean Society.

Life
Cochrane was born on 21 February 1886, the son of Douglas Cochrane, 12th Earl of Dundonald and Winifred Bamford-Hesketh (died 1924). He reached the rank of captain in the Scots Guards and fought in World War I, serving on the General Staff. For his services in the war he was awarded the Order of the Merit of Chile and made a Grand Officer, Order por Servicios Distinguidos of Peru.

He succeeded to the Earldom of Dundonald and its subsidiary titles of 13th Lord Cochrane of Paseley and Ochiltrie on the death of his father, 12 April 1935. He was a representative peer for Scotland between 1941 and 1955, and was the chairman of the Anglo-Chilean Society. He died unmarried on 23 May 1958.

Army 
In November of 1914, Thomas was 'invalided' home after having been wounded while fighting with his regiment at the front line.

Gwrych Castle 
The family seat was located at Gwrych Castle. The estate was acquired by the 12th Earl of Dundonald in 1878, through his marriage to Winifred Bamford-Hesketh, sole heiress of Robert Bamford-Hesketh.

In 1919, Cochrane's mother sold portions of the family estate, including surrounding land and mines. When she died in 1924, she left the remainder of the estate to King George V. The King, unable to accept the gift, turned the property over to the Order of St John of Jerusalem. In 1928, the estate was eventually sold back to the 12th Earl of Dundonald for £78,000. During World War II, the estate was used to house 200 Jewish refugee children from the Kindertransport. In 1946, following the war, the 13th Earl of Dundonald, resold the entire estate to Robert Rennie of Chester for £12,000.

References 

1886 births
1958 deaths
13
Scots Guards officers
Scottish representative peers
British Army personnel of World War I
Thomas